Orsini is a surname of Italian origin, originally derived from Latin ursinus ("bearlike") and originating as an epithet or sobriquet describing the name-bearer's purported strength.  Notable people with the surname include the following:

Angel Orsini, American wrestler and bodybuilder
Felice Orsini (1819–1858), Italian revolutionary who attempted to assassinate Napoléon III
Francesca Orsini, Italian scholar of South Asian literature
Giambattista Orsini (d. 1503), Italian Catholic Cardinal instrumental in the 1492 Papal Conclave
Marina Orsini (born 1967), Canadian actress
Richard Orsini, 13th-century ruler in Italy and the Balkans
Umberto Orsini (born 1934), Italian stage, television, and film actor
Valentino Orsini (1927–2001), Italian film director

Orsini family, Italian noble family, including:
Alessandro Orsini (cardinal) (1592–1626), cardinal
Clarice Orsini (1453–1488), wife of Lorenzo de' Medici, Lady Of Florence, mother of Pope Leo X
Fulvio Orsini (1529–1600), Italian historian
Giordano Orsini (died 1438) (died 1438), 15th-century Italian cardinal
Giordano Orsini (died 1173) (died 1173), Catholic prelate
Giorgio Orsini (1410–1475), architect and sculptor
Pope Nicholas III, born Giovanni Gaetano Orsini
Giovanni Gaetano Orsini (cardinal) (c.1285–1335), nephew of Pope Nicholas III
John II Orsini (died 1335), known as the Despot of Epirus
Latino Orsini (1411–1477), Catholic cardinal
Latino Malabranca Orsini (d. 1294), Catholic prelate
Matteo Orsini (d. 1340), Catholic prelate
Napoleone Orsini (1420–1480), condottiero and papal commander
Paolo Orsini (1369-1416), condottiero 
Paolo Orsini (1450-1503), condottiero 
Paolo Giordano I Orsini (1541–1585), first duke of Bracciano
Paolo Giordano II Orsini (1591–1656), nobleman
Pope Benedict XIII, born Pietro Francisco Orsini
Rinaldo Orsini (d. 1450), Lord of Piombino
Virginio Orsini (1434–1497), Lord of Bracciano

See also